Grönadal  is a village in Karlskrona Municipality, Blekinge County, situated on the southern coast of Sweden. According to the 2005 census, the village had a population of 78 people.

Populated places in Karlskrona Municipality